Leonard Freeman (October 31, 1920 – January 20, 1974) was an American television writer and producer who is best remembered as the creator of the CBS series Hawaii Five-O in 1968. He appeared in a 1953 episode (#112) of the TV series The Lone Ranger.

Hawaii Five-O ran for twelve seasons, at the time a record for a crime drama. In 1960, he wrote for the series Route 66; in 1962, he produced The Untouchables.  In 1967, he produced the Clint Eastwood western film, Hang 'Em High. A decade earlier, he wrote scripts for the syndicated Men of Annapolis.

Freeman died in 1974 during the sixth season of Hawaii Five-O from complications of heart surgery.

References

External links

Hawaii Five-O Home Page FAQs

1920 births
1974 deaths
People from Sonoma County, California
Television producers from California
American television writers
American male television writers
Screenwriters from California
20th-century American businesspeople
Hawaii Five-O
20th-century American screenwriters
20th-century American male writers